All of Me is a 2015 Philippine romantic fantasy drama television series directed by Dondon Santos, starring Albert Martinez, JM de Guzman, Yen Santos and Arron Villaflor. The series premiered on ABS-CBN's Kapamilya Gold afternoon block and worldwide via The Filipino Channel from August 31, 2015 to January 29, 2016, replacing FlordeLiza and was replaced by Tubig at Langis.

This series is currently aired on Kapamilya Online Live Global every Tuesday to Saturday, 11:30 pm and was replaced by Bagong Umaga.

Full episodes can be streaming on ABS-CBN Entertainment YouTube Channel.

Synopsis
Follow the story of Manuel Figueras (Albert Martinez), a devoted doctor, who decides to leave his flourishing career behind by living in an island after his wife, Dianna (Ina Raymundo) dies. While at the island, he meets Lena Dimaculangan (Yen Santos), a young woman who boldly challenges him to embrace life again, and despite their age gap, they find themselves in love. During their honeymoon in the island, a hired killer tries to kill Manuel, but he escapes death when he stumbles upon a magic portal that transforms him back to his younger self (JM de Guzman). Now, a younger Manuel who discovers that time has advanced faces another big challenge in his life – to seek revenge and win back Lena who is now happily married to his former protégé, Dr. Henry Nieves (Arron Villaflor), or forget her entirely and start a brand new chapter of his life.

Cast and characters

Main cast
 Albert Martinez as Dr. Manuel Figueras
 JM de Guzman as Edong / teen Manuel Figueras
 Yen Santos as Lena Dimaculangan-Figueras/Nieves
 Arron Villaflor as Dr. Henry Nieves

Supporting cast
 Dentrix Ponce as Ivan Figueras / young Manuel Figueras
 Sue Ramirez as Kristel Sebastian
 Yam Concepcion as Bianca Rellosa-Nieves
 Neri Naig-Miranda as Princess Dimaculangan
 Ana Capri as Bebeng Dimaculangan
 Akira Morishita as Ringgo Dimaculangan
 Barbie Imperial as Apple de Asis
 Jordan Herrera as Ricardo "Carding" Sebastian
 Josef Elizalde as Lawrence
 Micah Muñoz as Nonoy

Guest cast
 Rayver Cruz as Marlon Santos
 John Manalo as CarlaManalo
 Devon Seron as Rachel Manalo
 Susan Africa as Maria "Lola Aya" Sebastian
 Perla Bautista as Estrella
 Lorenzo Mara as Dr. Raul Zaragoza
 Lui Villaluz as Martin de Asis
 Bing Davao as Anselmo Dimaculangan
 Marco Alcaraz as Daniel
 Paolo Serrano as Marvin
 Junjun Quintana as Dennis Gonzaga

Special participation
 MJ Lastimosa as Tagapagbantay / Diwata Mizuchi / Salvacion
 Angel Aquino as Rosita Figueras
 Ina Raymundo as Dianna Figueras
 Jaime Fabregas as Dr. Vicente Avila
 Bugoy Cariño as young Henry Nieves
 Patrick Garcia as young Vicente Avila
 Precious Lara Quigaman as Vicente's mother
 Dentrix Ponce as young Manuel Figueras

Ratings

International broadcast

See also
 List of programs broadcast by ABS-CBN
 List of drama series of ABS-CBN

References

External links

ABS-CBN drama series
Philippine romance television series
Fantaserye and telefantasya
2015 Philippine television series debuts
2016 Philippine television series endings
Filipino-language television shows
Television shows set in the Philippines